Benjamin M. Ogles (born 1961) was the dean of Arts and Sciences at Ohio University and became dean of the Brigham Young University (BYU) College of Family, Home and Social Sciences in July 2011.

Ogles was born in Whittier, California but raised in Brigham City, Utah from the age of five. He graduated from Box Elder High School and then attended Brigham Young University receiving his bachelor's degree in accounting. While at BYU Ogles took two years off to serve as a missionary for the Church of Jesus Christ of Latter-day Saints in Norway.

Ogles totally switched his focus and entered a graduate program in clinical psychology at BYU. His Ph.D. advisor was Michael J. Lambert.  Ogles did a clinical internship at Indiana University. He completed his Ph.D. in 1990 and that year became a professor of psychology at Ohio University. He would later serve as head of the department of psychology at Ohio University.
 
Publications co-authored by Ogles have appeared in the Journal of Clinical Psychology, Professional Psychology: Research and Practice and the Journal of Child and Family Studies among other publications. He was the lead author of the book Essentials in Outcome Management written with Michael J. Lambert and S. Field.
 
Ogles was also the lead researcher involved in producing the Ohio Youth Problems, Functioning and Satisfaction Scales.

In March 2014, Ogles was made president of the LDS Church's Provo YSA 17th Stake.
 
Ogles is married to Maureen Garrett.

References

bio from Ogles' web page
Ohio University Department of Psychology bio of Ogles
BYU news release on Ogles appointment as dean
Ohio University announcement of appointment of Oggles as dean
Amazon.com entry for Ogles
AAC&U News that contains an article that mentions Ogles activities as dean at OU

1961 births
American leaders of the Church of Jesus Christ of Latter-day Saints
People from Brigham City, Utah
Brigham Young University alumni
Ohio University faculty
Living people
Brigham Young University faculty
21st-century American psychologists
Latter Day Saints from California
Latter Day Saints from Utah
Latter Day Saints from Indiana
Latter Day Saints from Ohio
20th-century American psychologists